Cooroora was an electoral district of the Legislative Assembly in the Australian state of Queensland from 1912 to 1992.

It was based mainly on the area of the district of Wide Bay and named after Mount Cooroora, near the town of Pomona.

Cooroora was mainly a safe Country/National seat, but was one of the many seats that Labor won in the 1989 election landslide.

It was abolished in the 1991 redistribution under the Goss government, and its territory distributed between the new districts of Noosa and Maroochydore.

Members for Cooroora

Election results

See also
 Electoral districts of Queensland
 Members of the Queensland Legislative Assembly by year
 :Category:Members of the Queensland Legislative Assembly by name

References

Former electoral districts of Queensland
Constituencies established in 1912
Constituencies disestablished in 1992
1912 establishments in Australia
1992 disestablishments in Australia